, also known as Doraemon the Movie 2018, is a Japanese anime science fiction action-adventure film. It is the 38th Doraemon film. The story is based on Robert Louis Stevenson's 1883 novel Treasure Island, with a screenplay written by Genki Kawamura - the producer of Your Name and The Boy and the Beast. Kazuaki Imai, an episode director on the Doraemon television anime, directs the project as his first Doraemon franchise film.

Plot
Upon hearing about the story of Treasure Island, Nobita dreams of discovering and exploring his own treasure island, despite the fact all of the Earth has been mapped already. Doraemon provides Nobita a special treasure map that shows him the location of a treasure island. At the same time, the media announces the discovery of a completely unknown island. Believing the new island is the treasure island, Nobita and Doraemon recruits Shizuka to accompany them, with Doraemon providing a ship. Gian and Suneo also tag along. 

However, as they get near the island, they are suddenly attacked by a gang of pirates. At that moment, the island begins to move, revealing that it is, in fact, part of a massive advanced technological ship. The pirates retreat, but abduct Shizuka in the process. Nobita and his friends are unable to rescue her, but save an unconscious boy named Flock. Flock explains that the pirates that attacked them are in fact time travelers, who travel to different eras to steal treasures off the sea floor, and he himself was part of the ship's crew, but decided to desert since he couldn't accept taking orders from Captain Silver. Doraemon uses the treasure map to track the pirate ship's location. 

Meanwhile, on the pirate ship, Shizuka encounters Sarah, Flock's sister and also looks like Shizuka. Sarah agrees to help Shizuka. Both Flock and Sarah reveal that Captain Silver is actually their father, who went mad when their mother died and has become obsessed with gathering as much treasure as possible. Nobita and his friends attempt a rescue operation, but end up rescuing picking up Sarah instead of Shizuka, who is taken directly to Captain Silver. Captain Silver then moves on the final stage of his plan. Having seen humanity's destruction in the future, Captain Silver is determined to launch his pirate ship into space and colonize a new planet with all of the treasure he has acquired. However, this requires him to drain the Earth's energy to get the power he needs to reach space. 

Doraemon warns that taking Earth's energy will result in its destruction. Due to which, Nobita and his friends, along with Flock and Sarah, attack the pirate ship again. Gian and Suneo stay behind to occupy the pirates while Nobita, Doraemon, Flock, and Sarah confront Captain Silver directly. While Nobita and Doraemon delay the activation of the pirate ship's engine, Flock is able to seize control of the ship and eject the energy back into Earth. Captain Silver realizes his mistakes about neglecting his children, and abandons his plans, promising to be a better father to them. Afterwards, Flock, Sarah, Captain Silver, and the rest of the crew return to their own time while Nobita and his friends return home, with Nobita gaining a new appreciation for his own father.

Cast

Release
This film was released on March 3, 2018 in Japan, and was later dubbed in Hindi and released on September 11, 2022 on Hungama TV.

Box office 
Debuting on 381 screens with Toho distributing, Doraemon the Movie: Nobita's Treasure Island earned $7.97million on 716,629 admissions in its first weekend and ranked number-one on Japanese box office. Its opening weekend is considered as the highest among all the films in the franchise and became the first Doraemon film to cross ¥5 billion and the highest attended film with over 4.6 million admissions.

This film opened in China on 1 June 2018 and grossed  on its opening day. It grossed  after 19 days of release. Its final gross in China was $31,578,357 as of July 2018. The film also grossed $1,012,837 in Hong Kong as of August 2018 and $1,221,563 in South Korea as of September 9, 2018.

References

External links

   

Nobita's Treasure Island
2018 anime films
Japanese animated science fiction films
2010s science fiction films
Japanese science fiction films
2018 animated films
2018 films
Animated films about cats
Robot films
2010s adventure films
Treasure Island films
Films about schizophrenia
Films about post-traumatic stress disorder
Films scored by Takayuki Hattori